The Rio Grande worm lizard (Amphisbaena pretrei) is a species of worm lizard in the family Amphisbaenidae. The species is endemic to Brazil.

Etymology
The specific name, pretrei, is in honor of French artist Jean-Gabriel Prêtre.

Description
A. pretrei is reddish brown dorsally, and white ventrally.

Reproduction
A. pretrei is oviparous.

References

Further reading
Duméril AMC, Bibron G (1839). Erpétologie générale ou Histoire naturelle complète des Reptiles. Tome cinquième [Volume 5]. Paris: Roret. viii + 854 pp. (Amphisbæna pretrei, new species, pp. 486-489). (in French).
Gans C (1965). "Redescription of Amphisbaena pretrei Duméril and Bibron and A. leucocephala Peters, with a Discussion of their Relation and Synonymy (Amphisbaenia: Reptilia)". American Midland Naturalist 74 (2): 387-407.
Gans C (2005). "Checklist and Bibliography of the Amphisbaenia of the World". Bulletin of the American Museum of Natural History (289): 1-130. (Amphisbaena pretrei, p. 18).
Vanzolini PE (2002). "An aid to the identification of South American species of Amphisbaena (Squamata, Amphisbaenidae). Papéis Avulsos de Zoologia, Museu de Zoologia da Universidade de São Paulo 42 (15): 351-362.

Amphisbaena (lizard)
Reptiles described in 1839
Taxa named by André Marie Constant Duméril
Taxa named by Gabriel Bibron
Endemic fauna of Brazil
Reptiles of Brazil